Elia Lombardini (11 April 1794 – 19 December 1878) was an Italian engineer and senator.

Life
He was born in La Broque in 1794. Despite the early death of his father, who was from Cremona and who left his family in serious economic difficulties, Lombardini enrolled at the University of Pavia in 1813, following the curriculum of mathematical studies, but he graduated at the University of Bologna as a pupil of Giuseppe Venturoli. Shortly after, he obtained a position as assistant engineer at the consortium of the Cremonesi arginists and in 1839 he moved to Milan where he served as adjunct inspector for the waters and became a member of the Royal Lombard Institute of Sciences, Letters and Arts, also becoming a friend of Carlo Cattaneo.

He became a general manager of public works in Lombardy, so he was unable to participate in the Five Days of Milan in 1848 due to an illness contracted during a mission to the Duchy of Modena. From his long illness he never fully recovered and in 1856 he obtained an early retirement, also to continue his engineering studies to which he could never fully dedicate himself as he would have liked.

The same year the Austrian Empire conferred on him the honor of order of the crown.

He died in Milan in 1878.

Works

References

1794 births
1878 deaths
19th-century Italian engineers
Members of the Senate of the Kingdom of Italy
University of Bologna alumni